BBC News at Ten  formerly known as the BBC Ten O'Clock News or the Ten O'Clock News  is the flagship evening news programme for the BBC News channel and British television channel BBC One on weekdays and Sundays at 10:00pm. Huw Edwards is the lead presenter for the bulletin on weekdays. The Sunday edition of the bulletin is presented by Mishal Husain or Clive Myrie. The programme was controversially moved from 9:00pm to 10:00pm on 16 October 2000.

From 4 February 2015 to 27 December 2019, the programme had a 45-minute format, with a half-hour segment focusing on British national and international news (with an emphasis on the latter), a 12-minute segment of local news from the BBC's regions around the country, and concluding with the national weather forecast. The programme used a shortened, 35-minute format on Friday nights to accommodate The Graham Norton Show. On 4 February 2019, in order to accommodate a new time slot focusing on youth programmes from BBC Three, the shortened format was adopted on a nightly basis. The programme was re-extended during the 2019 general election and during the COVID-19 pandemic it was extended back to its 45-minute format, with Newsnight moving to 10:45pm on BBC Two. Since mid-2021, the programme reverted to its 35-minute format.

During the first three months of its revival, ITV News at Ten averaged 2.2 million viewers compared with an average of 4.8 million viewers watching the BBC bulletin over the same period.

History
The programme was launched on 16 October 2000, replacing the BBC Nine O'Clock News which had been on the air since 14 September 1970. Its launch presenters were Michael Buerk and Peter Sissons. The move to 10:00pm was a response to the controversial axing of rival broadcaster ITV's News at Ten. ITV reinstated a 20-minute news bulletin at 10:00pm on 22 January 2001, instigating a head-to-head clash with the BBC. The BBC's Ten O'Clock News eventually became the more popular programme, establishing itself on the BBC One schedule for at least six days a week. ITV's bulletin suffered as a result of poor scheduling, and on 2 February 2004 the bulletin moved to 10:30pm. In 2008, ITV reinstated News at Ten which remains the BBC's main competitor.

Buerk and Sissons left the BBC Ten O'Clock News on 19 January 2003 to make way for presenters Huw Edwards and Fiona Bruce. To mark this presenter reshuffle, on Monday 20 January 2003 as Edwards and Bruce took over, the bulletin and the rest of BBC One news bulletins were relaunched with a new studio.

Since 5 February 2006, the bulletin has been simulcast on the BBC News channel. Following the BBC One bulletin, the remaining portion of the BBC Ten O'Clock News Hour is followed by Sports News and 'The Papers'.

On 21 April 2008, the programme, along with the rest of BBC News, underwent a graphical refresh and moved into a refurbished studio (N6). It also changed its name to BBC News at Ten.

After the regional news, there is a weather forecast from the BBC Weather Centre: presenters include Tomasz Schafernaker, Ben Rich and Philip Avery.

BBC News at Ten was named News Programme of the Year at the RTS Television Journalism Awards in 2005, 2009 and 2010.

The programme, along with the BBC News and the others BBC One bulletins, moved to Broadcasting House and began broadcasting in high-definition on 18 March 2013.

Following a five-month trial during the run-up to the 2015 general election, it was announced that the programme would be permanently extended to 45 minutes on Mondays through Thursdays from January 2016 (with the Friday-night edition retaining its original length to accommodate The Graham Norton Show).

After 16 years in the role, on 4 January 2019, Bruce stepped down as the programme's main presenter on Fridays in order to replace David Dimbleby on Question Time. Sophie Raworth and Clive Myrie serve as the regular presenters on Fridays with Bruce occasionally appearing on the programme as a relief presenter.

On 4 February 2019, it was announced that the programme would be shortened back to 35 minutes beginning 4 March 2019, to accommodate a new broadcast of BBC Three programmes on Monday, Tuesday, and Wednesday nights. The decision faced criticism from those who believed this was the result of cuts. BBC staff denied that this was the case, arguing that the time slot could help attract BBC Three's target audience, and would also remove the scheduling overlap with Newsnight on BBC Two.

On 16 March 2020, in light of the COVID-19 pandemic, the programme was extended to a 45-minute bulletin until 13 March 2022 to avoid competing with Newsnight. The 10 o'clock news bulletin is on for 30 minutes, with news bulletins from the BBC's regional services lasting for 15 minutes. On 19 July 2021, the bulletin went back to 35 minutes, with Newsnight returning to its normal time of 10:30pm.

On 26 May 2022, the BBC announced that the BBC News at Six and Ten, along with BBC Breakfast will be revamped in June 2022 to include a completely new studio and presentation, as part of a wider rebrand of the BBC in general. Local regional programmes will also be revamped over the coming months to tie in with the regional BBC channels broadcasting in HD by the beginning of 2023.

On 13 June 2022, the BBC News at 10 broadcast their first edition from the new studio set, which is a much larger studio than before with different sized screens which can be interacted with by reporters and the presenter. A new semi-circle desk has also been introduced, as well as a spiral staircase in a nod to the previous studio which showed the spiral staircase in the newsroom. The BBC News at 6 broadcast their first edition from the new studio a day later. Since then, the BBC Weather forecasts follow both the 6 and 10 O'clock national bulletins, which is also followed by introductions to regional news programmes from England and national news programmes from Scotland, Wales and Northern Ireland.

The same opening titles and theme music will still be used for the time being, but will be replaced in the near future due to cost constraints currently facing the BBC. The new studio set will also be able to be used for other News & Current Affairs programmes, and will eventually be the main studio for all news programmes when BBC World News merges into the new unified BBC News.

Out-of-studio presenting
As well as presenting from the main studio, the main presenters are called upon to present on location when major stories break. For example, Huw Edwards reported live from Washington for the 2008, 2012 and 2016 US presidential elections and has presented live from Basra at the withdrawal ceremony. He also regularly presented from Westminster, as well as from Edinburgh (at times when the referendum for Scottish independence was being developed).

During the 2012 Summer Olympics, presenters also made use of BBC's makeshift studios overlooking the Olympic Park at Stratford. George Alagiah presented from L'Aquila in April 2009, Haiti in 2010, Egypt in 2011 and Tacloban in 2013.

On 10 October 2018, due to technical problems at the Broadcasting House, Huw Edwards presented at BBC Millbank Studios.

In March 2022, Reeta Chakrabarti presented from Lviv (as well at the bulletins at One and Six) during the Russian invasion of Ukraine.

Staff

Editor
Paul Royall has been the editor of BBC News at Ten and BBC News at Six since 1 July 2013. Royall joined the BBC from ITV Meridian in 1997, working on News 24. He later became deputy editor of BBC Breakfast in January 2004, to the editor Mark Grannell. In May 2009, he became the deputy editor of the News at Ten and News at Six. He became editor on 22 July 2013, replacing James Stephenson who became Head of BBC World News.

Presenters

Current

Former
If there is no position before the years of being a presenter, then this newsreader was either a relief presenter or occasional guest presenter.
 Michael Buerk (main presenter, 2000–2003)
 Peter Sissons (main presenter, 2000–2003)
 George Alagiah (2000–2014)
 Darren Jordon (2004–2006)
 Dermot Murnaghan (2005–2007)
 Natasha Kaplinsky (2006–2007)
 Jon Sopel (2007)
 Emily Maitlis (2007–2013)
 Sian Williams (2008–2013)
 Simon McCoy (2019)

See also

 BBC News
 BBC Weekend News
 ITV News at Ten

References

External links
 
 

2000 British television series debuts
2010s British television series
2020s British television series
BBC television news shows
BBC News
British television news shows
Flagship evening news shows